Adolf Dahle (2 October 1890 – 1 November 1954) was a German painter. His work was part of the painting event in the art competition at the 1936 Summer Olympics.

References

1890 births
1954 deaths
20th-century German painters
20th-century German male artists
German male painters
Olympic competitors in art competitions
People from Hanover